Events from the year 2018 in Romania.

Incumbents 
President

Prime Minister 

President of the Senate

President of the Chamber of Deputies

Events

January 
 15 January – Prime Minister Mihai Tudose resigns after his Social Democratic Party leaders withdraw their support following a party feud.
 20 January – Tens of thousands of people protest in Romanian cities and abroad against amendments to the laws of justice and criminal codes.
 29 January – The Romanian parliament approves Viorica Dăncilă as the country's first female premier. She is the third prime minister of Romania in less than 13 months.

February 
 22 February – Justice Minister Tudorel Toader announces that he will initiate the revocation procedure of Laura Codruța Kövesi from the post of chief prosecutor of the National Anticorruption Directorate. The announcement is followed by protests in several major cities in the country.

March

April 
 5 April – Nine people die after their minibus plunges into Bistrița River, near Viișoara, Neamț County.
 11 April – Three tourists are found dead in Făgăraș Mountains after going missing since 30 March.
 16 April – President Klaus Iohannis refuses to dismiss the chief prosecutor of the National Anticorruption Directorate, Laura Codruța Kövesi, also criticizing the report on which Justice Minister Tudorel Toader proposed the revocation of Kövesi. Toader announces that he will refer the Constitutional Court.
 17 April – Former President Ion Iliescu is officially prosecuted for crimes against humanity for his role in the 1989 Revolution, alongside former Prime Minister Petre Roman.
 19 April – President of the Chamber of Deputies Liviu Dragnea announces Government's intention to move Romania's embassy in Israel from Tel Aviv to Jerusalem.

May

June 
 9 June – More than 100,000 people assemble in Bucharest to protest alleged abuses committed by anti-corruption prosecutors. The protest is organised by the governing Social Democratic Party.
 21 June – Liviu Dragnea, head of the Social Democratic Party, is convicted of abuse of power and handed a three-and-a-half-year sentence in an initial verdict after a corruption trial.
 27 June – Dăncilă Cabinet survives a motion of no confidence. During the vote, several thousand opposition supporters protest outside Parliament, calling for the resignation of the government.
 30 June – Four people are found dead and hundreds are evacuated from 185 flooded localities as hydrologists issue red flood warning in the counties of Covasna, Brașov and Bacău.

July 
 1 July – Celebrating the centenary of the Great Union (the unification of Romania with Bessarabia, Bukovina and Transylvania), a demonstration called the Centenary March is organized by several Romanian and Moldovan activists for unification. It starts in Alba Iulia on this day.
 9 July – President Klaus Iohannis dismisses the Chief Prosecutor of the National Anticorruption Directorate, Laura Codruța Kövesi.
 11 July – Four people, including two children, are found dead after their cart is washed away by a flash flood in Tulcea County.

August 
 10 August – Violence ensues between anti-government protesters and the Romanian Gendarmerie in Victory Square, resulting in hundreds of people wounded and the complete evacuation of the square.
 29 August – Participants of the Centenary March cross the Moldovan border.

September 
 1 September – The Centenary March ends in the Great National Assembly Square in Chișinău, Moldova.

October 
 6 and 7 October – A nationwide referendum is held in Romania regarding the prohibition of same-sex marriage, but it fails due to not reaching the required voter turnout. Another referendum is held at the same time in the Olt County to rename it to "Olt-Romanați County", but it fails as well for the same reason.

November

December 
 19 December – The main indexes of Bucharest Stock Exchange fall by more than 7 percent following the announcement of new taxes on banks, capping gas price and major changes regarding private pensions scheme. The two major banks listed at BSE lose more than 15 percent of their value.

Arts and entertainment 
 24 February – Touch Me Not, directed by Adina Pintilie, wins the Golden Bear prize for best film at the 68th Berlin International Film Festival.
 27 March – The 12th edition of the Gopo Awards: Daniel Sandu's One Step Behind the Seraphim is awarded best film, best director, best actor and best screenplay.
 5 April – Ioan-Aurel Pop, rector of Babeș-Bolyai University in Cluj-Napoca, is elected president of the Romanian Academy.
 10 May – The Humans represent Romania in the second semi-final of the Eurovision Song Contest in Lisbon, Portugal. For the first time since the introduction of the semi-finals, Romania's representatives fail to qualify for the final.
 9 June – The largest edition to date of Bucharest Pride attracts about 10,000 people.
 3–14 July – The 59th International Mathematical Olympiad is held in Cluj-Napoca.
 2–5 August – The 4th edition of Untold Festival is held in Cluj-Napoca.

Sports 
 9 June – Simona Halep wins her first Grand Slam title after defeating American Sloane Stephens in the French Open.

Deaths

January 

 2 January – , 81, intellectual, professor, engineer and researcher (b. 1936)
 4 January – Aharon Appelfeld, 85, Romanian-born Israeli writer.
 10 January – 
 , 83, singer and television presenter (b. 1934)
 , 78, academician and historian (b. 1939)
 , 64, mathematician (b. 1953)
 11 January – , 76, writer (b. 1941)
 24 January – 
 Ion D. Ion, 82, mathematician (b. 1935)
 Attila Verestóy, 63, Romanian politician and chemical engineer, Senator (since 1990).
 25 January – Neagu Djuvara, 101, Romanian historian, essayist and philosopher, pneumonia.

February 

 3 February – Alec Sehon, 93, Romanian-born Canadian immunologist.
 10 February – , 87, linguist (b. 1930)
 13 February – Florin Diacu, 59, Romanian Canadian mathematician and author.
 14 February – , 91, folklorist (b. 1926)
 16 February – , 67, Orthodox archimandrite and abbot of Berzunți Monastery (b. 1951)
 19 February – , 89, composer (b. 1928)
 22 February – Serban Cantacuzino, 89, Romanian architect.
 28 February – Ștefan Tașnadi, 64, Romanian weightlifter, Olympic silver medalist (1984).

March 

 4 March – , 76, politician (b. 1941)
 6 March – Peter Freund, 81, Romanian-born American physicist.
 9 March – Ion Voinescu, 88, Romanian Olympic footballer (1952).
 13 March – , 88, sculptress (b. 1929)
 19 March – , 56, presenter and programme-maker 
 25 March – Nicolae Tilihoi, 61, Romanian footballer (Universitatea Craiova).
 27 March – Aimée Iacobescu, 71, Romanian actress (The Doom), breast cancer.
 28 March – Octavian Dincuță, 70, footballer

April 

 1 April – , 84, engineering geologist and geophysicist (b. 1934)
 6 April – , 89, historian (b. 1928)
 11 April – Carmen Stănescu, 92, stage and film actress
 14 April – , 78, caricaturist (b. 1939)
 15 April – , 73, politician (b. 1945)
 16 April –
 Florea Dumitrescu, 91, economist, finance minister (1969–78), ambassador of Romania to China (1978–83) and governor of the National Bank (1984–89)
 , 72, politician
 , 70, folk music singer (b. 1947)
 24 April – Dinu C. Giurescu, 91, historian and politician

May 

 1 May – , 89, general, Minister of National Defense (1980–1985) and Mayor of Bucharest (1985–1988) (b. 1928)
 3 May – Doina Cornea, 88, Romanian human rights activist and professor.
 15 May – , 81, sports commentator, journalist and politician (b. 1937)
 16 May – 
 François Bréda, 62, Romanian writer and literary critic.
 Lucian Pintilie, 84, Romanian film director.
 21 May – , 91, academician, diplomat, mathematician, professor and essayist (b. 1927)
 22 May – Cabiria Andreian Cazacu, 90, mathematician and honorary member of the Romanian Academy.
 25 May – Hildegard Puwak, 68, Romanian politician, Minister of European Integration (2000–2003).

June 

 3 June – , 83, singer (b. 1934)
 5 June – Karl Fritz Lauer, 80, Romanian-German scientist.
 6 June – H. H. Wieder, 99, Romanian-born American physicist.
 11 June – Maria Butaciu, 78, folk music singer (b. 1940)
 20 June – Sándor Kányádi, 89, poet (b. 1929)
 21 June –
 Horaţiu Nicolau, 84, Romanian Olympic volleyball player.
 , 78, historian, archivist and writer (b. 1939)
 26 June – Joseph Seroussi, 85, Sudanese-born Romanian fashion designer.

July

August 

 2 August – Mihai Radu Pricop, 68, politician (b. 1950)
 7 August – Dumitru Fărcaș, 80, taragot player (b. 1938)
 19 August – Margareta Niculescu, 92, puppeteer, director, and teacher (b. 1926)

September 

 19 September – Geta Brătescu, 92, visual artist (b. 1926)

October 

 13 October – Georgeta Pitică, 88, table tennis player, world champion (b. 1930)
 21 October – Ilie Balaci, 62, footballer (b. 1956)

November 

 22 November – Nicolae Mihalcea, 96, Romanian Olympic equestrian (1952, 1956).
 23 November – Bujor Hălmăgeanu, 77, Romanian football player (Steaua București, national team) and manager (Dacia Unirea Brăila), respiratory failure.
 25 November – Randolph L. Braham, 95, Romanian-born American historian and political scientist.

December 

 16 December –
Mircea Petescu, 76, Romanian football player (Steaua București, UTA Arad) and manager (Sparta Rotterdam), Alzheimer's disease.
Anca Pop, 34, Romanian-Canadian singer-songwriter, traffic collision.

See also
 
2018 in the European Union
2018 in Europe
Romania in the Eurovision Song Contest 2018
Romania at the 2018 Winter Olympics
Romania at the 2018 Winter Paralympics
Romania at the 2018 Summer Youth Olympics

References

External links

 
2010s in Romania
Years of the 21st century in Romania